Latina is the capital of the province of Latina in the Lazio region, in central Italy. , the city has 126,612 inhabitants and is the second-largest city of the region, after the national capital Rome. It was founded as Littoria in 1932 under the fascist administration, when the area surrounding it which had been a swamp since antiquity was drained.

History

Although the area was first settled by the Latins, the modern city was founded by Benito Mussolini on 30 June 1932 as Littoria, named for the fascio littorio. The city was inaugurated on 18 December of the same year. Littoria was populated with settlers coming mainly from Friuli and Veneto, who formed the so-called Venetian-Pontine community (today surviving only in some peripheral boroughs). The edifices and the monuments, mainly in rationalist style, were designed by famous architects and artists such as Marcello Piacentini, Angiolo Mazzoni and Duilio Cambellotti.

In 1934 it became a provincial capital and, after World War II, renamed Latina in 1946. With the arrival of other people mostly from Lazio itself, the original Venetian-like dialect was increasingly substituted by a form of Romanesco dialect.

The city coat of arms is a blue shield with a stylized drawing of the City Hall Clock Tower in the middle, standing on a field of green, and flanked by two stalks of wheat tied at the base with a red ribbon engraved with the motto LATINA OLIM PALUS ("Latina, once a swamp") in Latin. The shield is surmounted by a mural crown.

Economy

The city has some pharmaceutical, chemical industry and a strong service sector. Latina is also an important centre for agriculture (vegetables, flowers, sugar, fruit, cheese and derivates).

The former Latina nuclear power plant has been shut down and is currently undergoing decommissioning.

Government

Frazioni

The frazioni of Latina are: Latina Lido, Latina Scalo, Borgo Bainsizza, Borgo Carso, Borgo Faiti, Borgo Grappa, Borgo Isonzo, Borgo Montello, Borgo Piave, Borgo Podgora, Borgo Sabotino, Borgo Santa Maria, Borgo San Michele, Chiesuola, and Tor Tre Ponti.

Geography

Latina is located in the Province of Latina, part of the southern section of the region of Lazio.

Climate

Latina has a Mediterranean climate (Köppen climate classification Csa) like most of southern Italy.

In popular culture

The Italian film My Brother Is an Only Child is set in Latina.

The Amazon web series Prisma follows the coming of age of a group of teenagers from Latina.

Notable residents

 Manuela Arcuri, actress
 Tiziano Ferro, pop singer
 Antonio Pennacchi, writer
 Karin Proia, actress
 Ilaria Spada, actress
 Sara Zanier, actress, model
 Elena Santarelli, actress, model, TV presenter
 Debora Salvalaggio, actress, model, showgirl
 Eugenio Cappuccio, film director
 Mattia Perin, football goalkeeper
 :it:Calcutta (cantante), Edoardo d'Erme, musician, composer

International relations

Twin towns / Sister cities

Latina is twinned with:

  Palos de la Frontera, Huelva, Andalusia, Spain
  Farroupilha, Rio Grande do Sul, Brazil
  Birkenhead, Wirral, Merseyside, England

Gallery

See also

 Latina railway station
 Latina Calcio 1932, a football club

References

External links

 Official website
 

 
Cities and towns in Lazio
Planned cities in Italy
Italian fascist architecture
Populated places established in 1932